Antelope Lake may refer to:

Antelope Lake (Clark County, South Dakota)
Antelope Lake (Day County, South Dakota)
Antelope Dam (California) (Plumas County, California)
Antelope Lake (Saskatchewan), a lake in Saskatchewan, Canada

See also
Antelope Dam (California)